Parliamentary elections were held in Poland on 30 May 1965.  They were the fourth elections to the Sejm, the parliament of the People's Republic of Poland, and fifth in Communist Poland. They took place on 30 May. The lists admitted were controlled  by the Front of National Unity (FJN), in turn controlled by the Polish United Workers' Party (PZPR).

The distribution of seats was decided before the elections by the FJN, and electors had no possibility to change it. The results of the 1965 election would be duplicated, exactly, by the 1969 and 1972 elections.

Results

As the other parties and "independents" were subordinate to PZPR, its control of the Sejm was total.

References

Further reading
Jerzy Drygalski, Jacek Kwasniewski, No-Choice Elections, Soviet Studies, Vol. 42, No. 2 (Apr., 1990), pp. 295–315, JSTOR
George Sakwa, Martin Crouch, Sejm Elections in Communist Poland: An Overview and a Reappraisal, British Journal of Political Science, Vol. 8, No. 4 (Oct., 1978), pp. 403–424, JSTOR
Informacja o dziatalnoici Sejmu PRL. (IV kadencja 1965-1969) (Warsaw: Sejm Chancellory Publications, 1969),

Poland
1965 in Poland
Parliamentary elections in Poland
Elections in the Polish People's Republic
May 1965 events in Europe
1965 elections in Poland